The American Journal of Biological Anthropology (previously known as the American Journal of Physical Anthropology) is a peer-reviewed scientific journal and the official journal of the American Association of Biological Anthropologists. It was established in 1918 by Aleš Hrdlička (U.S. National Museum, now the Smithsonian Institution's National Museum of Natural History).

The journal covers the field of biological anthropology, a discipline which Hrdlička defined in the first issue as "the study of racial anatomy, physiology and pathology." The Wistar Institute of Anatomy and Biology was the original publisher. Before launching publication, there were few outlets in the United States to publish scientific work in physical anthropology. Scientists hoping to learn more about recent discoveries often had to wait for several months or even years before becoming available in libraries throughout the country. In addition to its monthly issues, the association also publishes two supplements, the Yearbook of Physical Anthropology and a meeting supplement.

History 
In the 19th and early 20th centuries, anthropology was embedded in a larger milieu of scientific racism and eugenics. Hrdlička put prominent eugenicist Charles Davenport on the journal's editorial board, and used his connection to Madison Grant to obtain funding for his new journal. Hrdlička was deeply suspicious of genetics and statistics; not even standard deviations were allowed into his journal during his 24 years as editor-in-chief. After his death, the journal continued as the organ of the American Association of Physical Anthropologists, which Hrdlička had founded in 1930.

Modern focus 
Like the field of physical anthropology, the journal has grown and developed into research areas far beyond its origins. It publishes research in areas such as human paleontology, osteology, anatomy, biology, genetics, primatology, and forensic science.

Impact 

In 2009, the journal was selected by the Special Libraries Association as one of the top 10 most influential journals of the century in the fields of biology and medicine, along with the American Journal of Botany, British Medical Journal, Journal of Paleontology, Journal of the American Medical Association, Journal of Zoology, Nature, New England Journal of Medicine, Proceedings of the National Academy of Sciences, and Science. According to the Journal Citation Reports, its 2020 impact factor is 2.868, ranking it 15th out of 93 in the category "Anthropology" and 27th out of 50 in the category "Evolutionary Biology". Additionally, the journal has earned the most citations in the category "Anthropology" each year for over a decade.

Yearbook of Physical Anthropology 
The Yearbook of Physical Anthropology is an annual peer-reviewed supplement of the American Journal of Physical Anthropology. It provides "broad but thorough coverage of developments within the discipline" of physical anthropology.

Past editors 

 1918-1942 Aleš Hrdlička
 1943-1949 T. Dale Stewart
 1949-1954 William W. Howells
 1955-1957 Sherwood L. Washburn
 1958-1963 William S. Laughlin
 1964-1969 Frederick S. Hulse
 1970-1977 William S. Pollitzer
 1977-1983 Francis E. Johnston
 1983-1989 William A. Stini
 1989-1995 Matt Cartmill
 1995-2001 Emőke J.E. Szathmáry
 2001-2007 Clark Spencer Larsen
 2007-2013 Christopher B. Ruff
 2013-2019 Peter Ellison
 2019-     Trudy R. Turner

References

External links
American Journal of Biological Anthropology Official website
Yearbook of Biological Anthropology Official website

Annual journals
Anthropology journals
Paleontology journals
English-language journals
Monthly journals
Publications established in 1918
Wiley (publisher) academic journals
Academic journals associated with learned and professional societies of the United States